Casuarina is a genus of plants from the family Casuarinaceae

Casuarina can also refer to:
Casuarina, New South Wales
 Casuarina, Northern Territory
 Casuarina, Western Australia
Casuarina Islets, a pair of islets in South Australia.
 Casuarina Prison, a prison in Western Australia.
 Westin Casuarina Las Vegas Hotel, Casino & Spa
Casuarina (band), a Brazilian samba and choro band
 Casuarina Square, an shopping mall in Darwin, NT, Australia